Sawtooth Lake is an alpine lake in Custer County, Idaho, United States, located high in the Sawtooth Mountains in the Sawtooth National Recreation Area. A trail from the Iron Creek trailhead and campground leads approximately 5 miles to Sawtooth Lake. The Iron Creek trailhead can be accessed from State Highway 21 via Sawtooth National Forest road 619.

Sawtooth Lake is in the Sawtooth Wilderness and wilderness permit can be obtained at trailheads. The hike to Sawtooth Lake from the Iron Creek trailhead is one of the most popular hikes in the Sawtooth National Recreation Area. This trail gains , takes 5 to 6 hours round trip, and offers great views of Alpine Lake, Alpine Peak, and the Sawtooth Valley. Visitors are permitted to camp anywhere in the National Forest, and Sawtooth Lake often serves as a camp for further hikes throughout the northern Sawtooth Wilderness.

See also

 List of lakes of the Sawtooth Mountains (Idaho)
 Sawtooth National Forest
 Sawtooth National Recreation Area
 Sawtooth Range (Idaho)

References

External links

 Local Hike - Sawtooth Lake
Sawtooth Lake

Lakes of Idaho
Lakes of Custer County, Idaho
Glacial lakes of the United States
Glacial lakes of the Sawtooth Wilderness